Curtain Call is a live album by U.K. recorded during one single night in Kawasaki, Japan. The album was released in 2015 to coincide to the final concerts by the band, hence the title. The track list consists of complete live performances of the two studio albums by the band, U.K. and Danger Money, plus the two non-studio tracks present on the live album Night After Night. The line-up is the same as their previous live album Reunion – Live in Tokyo.

The set list also includes "Waiting for You", a previously unreleased song that was performed live during UK's last 1979 tour and that was intended to be included in the band's never recorded third studio album. The song "Mental Medication", from UK's first album, was never performed live before this special event.

The album was released as a double CD, DVD and Blu-ray and in a special package together with Eddie Jobson's Four Decades.

Track listing
All songs written by Eddie Jobson and John Wetton except as noted.

Personnel
U.K.
Eddie Jobson - keyboards, electric violin
John Wetton - vocals, bass
Alex Machacek - guitar
Marco Minnemann - drums

External links 
 Official Eddie Jobson website
 Official Jobson subscription fanclub

U.K. (band) albums
Live progressive rock albums
2015 live albums